Parachernes is a genus of pseudoscorpions in the subfamily Chernetinae, first described by Joseph Conrad Chamberlin in 1931.

Species of this genus are found in the Americas, and also in Australia (Parachernes sabulosus).

Species 
The Encyclopedia of Life lists 64 species. Some of which are:
Parachernes (Parachernes) argentatopunctatus 
Parachernes (Parachernes) argentinus 
Parachernes (Parachernes) confraternus 
Parachernes (Parachernes) crassimanus 
Parachernes (Parachernes) dissimilis 
Parachernes (Parachernes) fallax 
Parachernes (Parachernes) galapagensis 
Parachernes (Parachernes) sabulosus

References

External links 

 Western Australian Museum: Parachernes

Chernetidae
Pseudoscorpion genera
Animals described in 1931